The 1946 State of the Union Address was given by the 33rd President of the United States, Harry S. Truman, on Monday, January 21, 1946, to the 79th United States Congress. It was written by Samuel Rosenman and is notable for being the longest State of the Union message at the time: the written speech was sent to Congress, not orally given, and was 25,000 words long. The address combined Truman's economic report with state of the union information regrading returning to a peace economy after the end of World War Two, foreign policy in Europe and the admission of Hawaii into the United States. 

In the address, Truman stated, "At Moscow the United States, the Union of Soviet Socialist Republics, and Great Britain agreed to further this development by supporting the efforts of the national government and nongovernmental Chinese political elements in bringing about cessation of civil strife and in broadening the basis of representation in the Government. That is the policy which General Marshall is so ably executing today. It is the purpose of the Government of the United States to proceed as rapidly as is practicable toward the restoration of the sovereignty of Korea and the establishment of a democratic government by the free choice of the people of Korea." 

Truman also urged Congress to admit Hawaii into the United States, but cautioned them to wait on admitting Alaska until "it is certain that this is the desire of the people of that great territory".

See also
United States House of Representatives elections, 1946

References

State of the Union addresses
Presidency of Harry S. Truman
79th United States Congress
State of the Union Address
State of the Union Address
State of the Union Address
State of the Union Address
January 1946 events in the United States